Hans Hammond Rossbach (16 October 1931 – 7 August 2012) was a Norwegian politician for the Liberal Party.

He was elected to the Norwegian Parliament from Møre og Romsdal in 1965, and was re-elected on four occasions.

Rossbach was involved in local politics in Kristiansund between 1963 and 1971, and was a member of Møre og Romsdal county council during the term 1963–1967.

References

1931 births
2012 deaths
Liberal Party (Norway) politicians
Members of the Storting
20th-century Norwegian politicians
Politicians from Kristiansund